Sydney-Flinders was an electoral district of the Legislative Assembly in the Australian state of New South Wales, created in 1894 in inner Sydney from part of the electoral district of South Sydney and named after maritime explorer Matthew Flinders. It was in the Surry Hills area, bounded by Riley Street, Oxford Street, South Dowling Street, Nobbs Street, Davies Street and Tudor Street. It was abolished in 1904 and absorbed into the electoral district of Surry Hills.

Members for Sydney-Flinders

Election results

References

Former electoral districts of New South Wales
Constituencies established in 1894
1894 establishments in Australia
Constituencies disestablished in 1904
1904 disestablishments in Australia